Melica longiflora is a grass species in the family Poaceae that is endemic to Chile where it can be found from Coquimbo to Talca.

Description
The species is perennial and is caespitose as well. The leaf-sheaths are tubular, retrorsely scabrous, and are either glabrous or pilose on the bottom. Just like leaf-sheaths they are scabrous, but unlike them they are hairy, glabrous or pubescent, and are rough on both sides. Their margins are glabrous, scabrous or ciliated. The main panicle branches are contracted and have scaberulous or smooth axis, while the other panicle branches are secund.

Spikelets are solitary with fertile spikelets being pedicelled, pedicels of which are ciliated, curved, filiform, scabrous and hairy on top. Floret callus is pubescent. The bottom of both upper and lower glumes are asperulous but the apexes are different; Lower one is erose, obtuse, or sometimes acute, while the upper one is only acute. The lower glume is ovate and is 5-7 veined while the upper glume is only 5-veined. Palea is scabrous on the bottom and is 2-veined.

Flowers are fleshy, ciliate or glabrous, oblong, truncate, and grow together. The hilum is linear and is 1 length of the caryopses.

Ecology
Melica longiflora can be found growing on hills and central plains in the lower parts of the Andes on the elevation of  where similar genera, such as Eulychnia, Proustia, Trichocereus, and species Acacia caven, Baccharis linearis, Lithraea caustica, Peumus boldus, Puya chilensis, Schismus polygamus, and Trevoa trinervis can be found as well. The flowers bloom only August to December.

References

longiflora
Flora of South America